Jermantown is an unincorporated community in Fairfax County, Virginia, United States. Various parts of Jermantown are included within the independent city of Fairfax to its south and east. Today, this once rural community is centered at the intersection of Jermantown Road and Lee Jackson Memorial Highway (U.S. Route 50). The Old Jermantown School was located at the present site of Providence Elementary School.

History

Jermantown/Germantown, located near the critical intersection of the Little River Turnpike (today Route 50) and Warrenton Turnpike (today Route 29), was part of the Ox Hill battlefield on September 1, 1862, and was held by Union troops under General Joseph Hooker.

References

Unincorporated communities in Fairfax County, Virginia
Unincorporated communities in Virginia
Washington metropolitan area
Fairfax, Virginia